Barbara Kasten (born 1936) is an American artist from Chicago Illinois. Her work involves the use of abstract video and photograph projections.

Schooling and career
Kasten trained as a painter and textile artist at the University of Arizona (BFA), the California College of Arts & Crafts (MFA) with Trude Guermonprez, and a Fulbright-Hays Fellowship at the University of Fine Arts in Poznań with Magdalena Abakanowicz. She was influenced by the Bauhaus movement and László Moholy-Nagy. After school, she turned to photography to encompass her interdisciplinary work, beginning in 1973 with the commercial process of diazotype and subjects reminiscent of performance art. Working for over 40 years, she is often inspired by the act of depicting a three-dimensional space onto a two-dimensional plane. She often uses mirrors, lights, and props for conceptually-based pieces. As she continues her practice, her work has continued to pure abstraction.

Kasten completed her Master in Fine Arts Degree in sculpture textile design from California College of arts and crafts in 1970.

She has won many awards, notably the John Simon Guggenheim Fellowship.

In 2015, Kasten was given the first career survey of her work, entitled "Barbara Kasten: Stages" at the Institute of Contemporary Art, Philadelphia. It traveled to the Graham Foundation for Advanced Studies in the Fine Arts where it was presented in conjunction with the Chicago Architecture Biennial.

Monographs 

 Barbara Kasten: Architecture & Film (2015–2020), edited by Stephanie Cristello. Texts by Stephanie Cristello, Hans Ulrich Obrist, Humberto Moro, and Mimi Zeiger. Milan: Skira, 2022. (ISBN 9788857247199)
 Barbara Kasten: The Diazotypes, edited by Ellen Alderman and Lisa Leshowitz, text by Alex Klein. Chicago: Graham Foundation; New York: DAP, 2015.
Barbara Kasten: Stages, JRP|Ringier, Zurich, essays by Alex Kitnick, Alex Klein, Jenni Sorkin (2015)
Barbara Kasten: Works 1986-1990, RAM, Tokyo, Japan, essays by Deborah Irmas, Meg Perlman, Michele Druon (1991)
Constructs: Barbara Kasten, New York Graphic Society and The Polaroid Corporation, essay by Estelle Jussim (1985)
How We See: Photobooks by Women, 10x10 Photobooks, (2018)

Public collections 

 Art Institute of Chicago, Chicago, Illinois
 Museum of Contemporary Art, Los Angeles, California
 TATE Modern, London, UK
 New Mexico Museum of Art, Santa Fe, New Mexico
Ackland Art Museum, Chapel Hill, North Carolina 
Center for Creative Photography, University of Arizona, Tucson, Arizona
Washington State Arts Commission, Olympia
Saddle Mountain Elementary School, Mattawa

Selected solo exhibitions 
"Barbara Kasten: Works", Kunstmuseum Wolfsburg, Germany (2020)
"Sharjah Biennial 14: Leaving the Echo Chamber", Sharjah Biennial, Sharjah, U.A.E. (2019)
"Intervention, 2018" at Creative Chicago: An Interview Marathon, AON Grand Ballroom, Navy Pier, Chicago, Illinois (2018)

References

External links 
Official website

1936 births
Living people
California College of the Arts alumni
University of Arizona alumni
Photographers from Illinois
20th-century American women photographers
20th-century American photographers
21st-century American women